Marcelo da Paixão Ramos Nicácio (born 5 January 1983 in Salvador, Bahia) is a Brazilian footballer, who currently plays for CSA on loan from Boavista.

Career
In January 2009 Nicácio joined Fortaleza on loan from Atlético Mineiro. In the first half of the year, he scored 13 goals in the Campeonato Cearense. He also completed the season as the Série B's top goal-scorer with 17 goals.

In 2010, he signed for Figueirense and scored 2 goals in 10 matches of Série B.

Ceará
In September 2010, Nicácio joined Ceará. He made his debut in a 1–1 home draw against Goiás on 20 September, coming on as a substitute for Kempes. He scored his first goal on 2 October, in a 2–2 away draw against Corinthians.

In the first half of 2011, Nicácio scored 16 goals in the Campeonato Cearense and Ceará were crowned champions. He continued scoring as he scored Ceará's opening goal of the Série A match in their 3–0 win over Atlético Mineiro on 7 July. On 10 August, Nicácio scored a last-minute winning goal in a 2–1 home win over São Paulo in their second stage first leg tie of the Copa Sudamericana.

Litex Lovech
On 8 December 2011, Nicácio signed for Bulgarian A PFG side Litex Lovech. He made his league debut on 3 March 2012 in a 3–0 home win over Vidima-Rakovski, scoring a hat-trick. Week later, he scored a brace against Svetkavitsa at the Dimitar Burkov Stadium. On 14 March, Nicácio scored a penalty in a 2–0 win over Minyor Pernik in the Bulgarian Cup. He continued his fine form scoring the only goal in a 1–0 win against Slavia Sofia on 18 March. However, 37 minutes after his goal, he received his first red card in Bulgarian football.

Vitória
On 5 July 2012, Nicácio has signed for Brazilian club Vitória.

Paysandu
On 31 May 2013, Nicácio joined another team from his home country, Paysandu.

Statistics
All stats correct as of 2 April 2013.

Honours
Fortaleza
Campeonato Cearense: 2009

Ceará
Campeonato Cearense: 2011

Vitória
Campeonato Baiano: 2013

Individual
Campeonato Cearense Top scorer: 2009 (with 13 goals)
Campeonato Brasileiro Série B Top scorer: 2009 (with 17 goals)
Campeonato Cearense Top scorer: 2011 (with 16 goals)

References

External links

1983 births
Living people
Sportspeople from Salvador, Bahia
Brazilian footballers
Brazilian expatriate footballers
Campeonato Brasileiro Série A players
First Professional Football League (Bulgaria) players
Campeonato Brasileiro Série B players
Campeonato Brasileiro Série C players
Campeonato Brasileiro Série D players
Expatriate footballers in Bulgaria
Expatriate footballers in Saudi Arabia
Esporte Clube Bahia players
Xanthi F.C. players
Votoraty Futebol Clube players
Clube Atlético Mineiro players
Clube de Regatas Brasil players
América Futebol Clube (RN) players
Fortaleza Esporte Clube players
Figueirense FC players
Ceará Sporting Club players
PFC Litex Lovech players
Esporte Clube Vitória players
Paysandu Sport Club players
Al-Faisaly FC players
Boavista Sport Club players
Boa Esporte Clube players
Centro Sportivo Alagoano players
Pan American Games medalists in football
Pan American Games silver medalists for Brazil
Saudi Professional League players
Association football forwards
Footballers at the 2003 Pan American Games
Medalists at the 2003 Pan American Games